Shakheh is a village in Ilam Province, Iran.

Shakheh may also refer to:
Shakheh, alternate name of Shakh Kupal, Khuzestan Province
Shakheh-ye Albu Shahbaz, Khuzestan Province
Shakheh-ye Ghanem, Khuzestan Province
Shakheh-ye Jadid, Khuzestan Province
Shakheh-ye Mobaderi, Khuzestan Province
Shakheh-ye Pain, Andimeshk, Khuzestan Province
Shakheh-ye Sofla, Khuzestan Province